Upernattivik – also known as Upernarsuak – is an uninhabited island in King Frederick VI Coast, southeastern Greenland. Administratively it is part of the Sermersooq municipality.

Geography
Upernattivik is a coastal island in Umivik Bay, located between the Fridtjof Nansen Peninsula to the north and the Odinland Peninsula to the south.

There are some smaller islands in its vicinity, such as Trefoldigheden, Terne Island and Tre Lover to the west and Pikiitsi off its eastern point.

See also
List of islands of Greenland

References

External links
Den grønlandske Lods - Sejladsanvisninger Østgrønland
 East coast of Greenland. From Ihersuak to Umivik Bay. Surveyed during the 7th journey of the British Arctic Air Route Expedition, 1931
Gazetteer of Greenland

Uninhabited islands of Greenland
Sermersooq